The Panama Deception is a 1992 American documentary film, critical of the 1989 United States invasion of Panama.

The film was directed by Barbara Trent, written and edited by David Kasper, and narrated by actress Elizabeth Montgomery. It was a production of the Empowerment Project, and won the 1992 Academy Award for Best Documentary Feature.

Summary 
The film recounts the events which led to the invasion, the death and destruction caused by the invasion, and the aftermath. The film is critical of the actions of the United States Armed Forces. It also highlights purported media bias within the United States, showing events that were unreported or systematically misreported, including alleged downplaying of the number of civilian casualties. The film also argued that the true purpose of the invasion was to prevent the then-scheduled retrocession of the Panama Canal Zone to Panama as agreed in the Torrijos–Carter Treaties, rather than the stated justification of removing Manuel Noriega from power due to his indictment in U.S. courts on racketeering and drugs trafficking charges. (Panama ultimately gained full control over the Canal Zone on December 31, 1999, fulfilling the terms of the Torrijos-Carter agreements.)

The film states that the U.S. government invaded Panama in order to destroy the PDF, the Panama Defense Forces, which were perceived as a threat to U.S. control over Panama, and install a government which would be friendly to U.S. interests. The film includes footage of what are claimed to be mass graves uncovered after the American troops had withdrawn and footage of burned-down neighborhoods, refers to the alleged use of experimental weapons including supposed secret laser weapons, and presents depictions of some of the 20,000 refugees who fled the fighting.

Production 
The documentary was completed on a $300,000 budget provided by funding from Channel 4, Rhino Entertainment, J. Roderick MacArthur Foundation, the Rex Foundation, the Peace Development Fund, the National Council of Churches, the Vietnam Veterans of America Foundation, the Vanguard Public Foundation, Michael Moore, and other donors.

The film was banned in Panama, and in the United States the Public Broadcasting Service banned it from being broadcast. Several individual PBS member stations such as WNYC-TV, WGBH-TV, and KQED-TV defied the ban to broadcast it anyways.

See also 
 Politico-media complex

References

External links 
The Panama Deception at the Empowerment Project 

 
 

1992 films
American independent films
Best Documentary Feature Academy Award winners
Documentary films about American politics
Documentary films about journalism
Documentary films about war
American documentary films
George H. W. Bush administration controversies
Films about the United States Marine Corps
Panama–United States relations
United States invasion of Panama
Films shot in Panama
Documentary films about Latin America
Documentary films about war crimes
1990s English-language films
1990s American films